Barron River may refer to:
Barron River (Queensland), Australia
Electoral district of Barron River, Queensland, Australia
Barron River (Ontario), Canada
Barron River, a river in Everglades City, Florida